The 1998 African Men's Handball Championship was the 13th edition of the African Men's Handball Championship, held in Johannesburg, South Africa, from 19 to 28 October 1998. It acted as the African qualifying tournament for the 1999 World Championship in Egypt.

Tunisia win their fifth title beating Algeria in the final game 22–19.

Qualified teams

Group stage

Group A

Group B

Cameroon arrived late.

Knockout stage

Semifinals

Ninth place game

Seventh place game

Fifth place game

Third place game

Final

Final ranking

References

African handball championships
Handball
A
Handball
Handball in South Africa
1990s in Johannesburg
Sports competitions in Johannesburg
October 1998 sports events in Africa